Donald Scott Stewart is an American mechanical engineer, focusing in fluid mechanics and thermal sciences, currently the Shao Lee Soo Professor Emeritus at University of Illinois.

Early life and education
Stewart received a bachelor's degree in engineering science from State University of New York at Buffalo in 1976 and a doctorate in theoretical and applied science at Cornell University in 1981.

References

Year of birth missing (living people)
Living people
University of Illinois faculty
21st-century American engineers
Cornell University alumni
University at Buffalo alumni
Fellows of the American Physical Society